Reflection or reflexion may refer to:

Science and technology
 Reflection (physics), a common wave phenomenon
 Specular reflection, reflection from a smooth surface
 Mirror image, a reflection in a mirror or in water
 Signal reflection, in signal transmission
 Elastic scattering, a process in nuclear and particle physics 
 Reflection nebula, a nebula that is extended and has no boundaries
 Reflection seismology or seismic reflection, a method of exploration geophysics

Mathematics
 Reflection principle, in set theory
 Point reflection, a reflection across a point
 Reflection (mathematics), a transformation of a space
 Reflection formula, a relation in a function
 Reflective subcategory, in category theory

Computing
 Reflection (computer graphics), simulation of reflective surfaces
 Reflection (computer programming), a program that accesses or modifies its own code
 Reflection, terminal emulation software by Attachmate

Arts and entertainment

Film and television
  The Reflection (TV series), an anime series created by Stan Lee and Hiroshi Nagahama
 "Reflection", an episode of Power Rangers: SPD
 Reflection (2018 film), a Burmese film
 Reflection (2021 film), a Ukrainian film

Music

Albums
  Reflection (Brian Eno album) or the title song, 2017
 Reflection (Demis Roussos album), 1984
 Reflection (Derek Minor album), 2016
 Reflection (Loraine James album), 2021
  Reflection (Fifth Harmony album) or the title song, 2015
 Reflection (Hooverphonic album), 2013
  Reflection (Pentangle album) or the title song, 1971
 Reflection (Redrama album), 2014
  Reflection (The Rubyz album) or the title song, 2011
 Reflection (Steamhammer album), or Steamhammer, 1969
 Reflection (Tofubeats album) or the title song, 2022
  Reflection (Unashamed album) or the title song, 1996
 Reflection: Axiom of the Two Wings, by Mari Hamada, 2008
  The Reflection (album) or the title song, by Keb' Mo', 2011
 Reflection, by Mr. Children, 2015
 Reflection, by the Shadows, 1990
 Reflection, by Rophnan, 2018

Songs
 "Reflection" (song), from the soundtrack of the Disney film Mulan, 1998
 "Reflection", by BTS from Wings, 2016
 "Reflection", by Prince from Musicology, 2004
 "Reflection", by Seduce the Heaven, 2013
 "Reflection", by Tool from Lateralus, 2001
 "Reflection", by Young Dolph and Key Glock from Dum and Dummer, 2019
 "Reflection", by Bobbie Singer
 "The Reflection", by the Haunted from The Dead Eye, 2006

Other art
 Reflection, installation art by Shane Cooper
 The Reflection, a work of fiction by Hugo Wilcken

Other uses
 Self-reflection, the ability to witness and evaluate our own cognitive, emotional, and behavioural processes
 Reflection, a tool used in reflective practice and education

See also
 
 
 Reflector (disambiguation)
 Reflections (disambiguation)
 Reflexive (disambiguation)